Hovenäset is a locality in Sotenäs Municipality in Västra Götaland County and is located about 3 km north of Kungshamn.

Populated places in Västra Götaland County
Populated places in Sotenäs Municipality